Defending champion Stéphane Houdet and his partner Gordon Reid defeated Michaël Jérémiasz and Nicolas Peifer in the final, 6–3, 6–1 to win the men's doubles wheelchair tennis title at the 2015 US Open.

Houdet and Shingo Kunieda were the defending champions, but did not participate together. Kunieda partnered Joachim Gérard, but was defeated by Jérémiasz and Peifer in the semifinals.

Seeds

Draw

Bracket

References
Draw

Wheelchair Men's Doubles
U.S. Open, 2015 Men's Doubles